Foundation is an album by British producer Breakage. The album's main styles are dubstep, UK garage and drum & bass. It was released on 22 March 2010, on the Digital Soundboy label.

Track listing
"Open Up" – 5:10
"Hardcore Music (Interlude)" – 0:36
"Hard (featuring David Rodigan & Newham Generals)" – 3:43
"Digiboy Radio (Interlude)" – 1:08
"Old Skool Ting" – 5:19
"Squid Bass (Interlude)" – 0:48
"Run 'em Out (featuring Roots Manuva)" – 4:08
"Temper" (featuring Kemo) – 5:27
"Over (featuring Zarif)" – 4:22
"Higher" – 5:38
"Foundation" – 5:12
"Justified (featuring Erin)" – 4:48
"Vial (featuring Burial)" – 3:54
"Speechless (featuring Donae'o)" – 4:22
"If (Interlude)" – 0:42
"If (featuring Threshold)" – 5:46

References

Breakage (musician) albums
2010 albums